In Japan,  is considered a major social issue. In 2017, the country had the seventh highest suicide rate in the OECD, at 14.9 per 100,000 persons, and in 2019 the country had the second highest suicide rate among the G7 developed nations. However, on a global scale, Japan ranks lower on the suicide rate in 49th place, having a lower rate of suicides compared to some other developed nations. 

During the 1997 Asian financial crisis, rates of suicide spiked heavily, increasing by 34.7% in 1998 alone and remaining relatively high for over a decade. After peaking in 2003, suicide rates have been gradually declining, falling to the lowest on record (since 1978) in 2019. Monthly suicide rates in Japan increased by 16% between July and October 2020, due to a number of reasons attributed to the COVID-19 pandemic.

Seventy percent of suicides in Japan are male, and it is the leading cause of death in men aged 20–44.

Historically, cultural attitudes towards suicide in Japan have been described as "tolerant", with certain types of suicides being considered honorable, especially during military service. During World War II, the Empire of Japan regularly employed banzai charge suicide attacks, and towards the end of the war, kamikaze units, and encouraged suicide as a preferable alternative to capture.

Motives for suicide
In order to better overview the motives behind suicides, in 2007, the National Police Agency (NPA) revised the categorization of motives for suicide into a division of 50 reasons, with up to three reasons listed for each suicide.

, health issues led the motive for 49% all suicides. However, because the category for health issues includes both mental (e.g., depression) and physical issues, it is not possible to distinguish between the two. Financial or poverty-issues led 17%, household issues at 15%, and workplace issues at 10%. Relationship issues and school led 4% and 2% respectively, while remaining 10% were for other reasons.

Demographics of suicide victims
Most suicides are men: 70% of suicide victims in 2019 were male. Among men 20~44 years old, and among women 15~29 years old, it is the leading cause of death.

Males are two times more likely to cause their own deaths after a divorce than females are. 

By occupation, 59.3% of suicide victims were in the broad "Not Employed" category, which is not to be confused with the colloquialism "unemployed" (as in those who are seeking but unable to find a job). The "Not Employed" category also includes pensioners, homemakers and others. 

The prefecture with the highest overall suicide rates as of 2019 was Yamanashi prefecture, with 22.3 suicide victims per 100,000 inhabitants, 39% above the national average of 16.0 victims per 100,000 people. The three prefectures with the lowest suicide rate were Kanagawa, Kyoto, and Osaka prefecture, with respective rates of 11.7, 12.5, and 14.0

While the teenage suicide rate in Japan is lower than the OECD country average, teenage suicide rates have been the only category to increase slightly in recent years, despite the significant drop in overall suicide rates over the past decade. The motives for suicides may be related to bullying, but can also be due to abuse from teachers. The Japanese neologism shidōshi (指導死) can be used in cases where students commit suicide as a result of strict discipline from teachers.

Suicide sites/hotspots
An infamous location for suicides is Aokigahara, a forested area at the base of Mount Fuji. In the period leading up to 1988, around 30 suicides occurred there every year. In 1999, 74 suicides occurred, the most on record in a given year until 2002, when 78 suicides were found. The following year, a total of 105 bodies were found, making 2003 the deadliest year on record in Aokigahara. The area is patrolled by police looking for suicides. Police records show that, in 2010, there were 247 suicide attempts (54 of which were fatal) in the forest.

Railroad tracks are also a common place for suicide, and the Chūō Rapid Line is particularly known for a high number. Some Japanese railroad companies have installed platform screen doors,  and/or blue-tinted lights which are intended to calm people's mood, in attempts to decrease suicide attempts in stations.

Ties with business
Japan's economy, the world's third-largest, experienced its worst recession since World War II in early 2009, propelling the nation's jobless rate to a record high of 5.7 percent in July 2009, causing a small uptick in suicides that year.  As a result of job losses, social inequality (as measured on the Gini coefficient) has also increased, which has been shown in studies to have affected the suicide rates in Japan proportionately more than in other OECD countries.

A contributing factor to the suicide statistics among those who were employed was the increasing pressure of retaining jobs by putting in more hours of overtime and taking fewer holidays and sick days. According to government figures, "fatigue from work" and health problems, including work-related depression, were prime motives for suicides, adversely affecting the social wellbeing of salarymen and accounting for 47 percent of the suicides in 2008. Out of 2,207 work-related suicides in 2007, the most common reason (672 suicides) was overwork.

Furthermore, the void experienced after being forced to retire from the workplace is said to be partly responsible for the large number of elderly suicides every year. In response to these deaths, many companies, communities, and local governments have begun to offer activities and classes for recently retired senior citizens who are at risk of feeling isolated, lonely, and without purpose or identity.

Consumer loan companies have much to do with the suicide rate. The National Police Agency states that one fourth of all suicides are financially motivated. Many deaths every year are described as being . Japanese banks set extremely tough conditions for loans, forcing borrowers to use relatives and friends as guarantors who become liable for the defaulted loans, producing extreme guilt and despair in the borrower. Rather than placing the burden on their guarantors, many have been attempting to take responsibility for their unpaid loans and outstanding debts through life insurance payouts. In fiscal year 2005, 17 consumer loan firms received a combined 4.3 billion yen in suicide policy payouts on 4,908 borrowers – or some 15 percent of the 32,552 suicides in 2005. Lawyers and other experts allege that, in some cases, collectors harass debtors to the point they take this route. Japanese nonbank lenders, starting in the mid-1990s, began taking out life insurance policies which include suicide payouts on borrowers that included suicide coverage, and borrowers are not required to be notified. On 13 December 2006, a revision to the Money Lending Business Law was made that prevents lenders from taking out suicide insurance on debtors.

Cultural attitude towards suicide
There is substantial cultural tolerance for suicide, which has been "elevated to the level of an aesthetic experience" through cultural and social experiences common to many Japanese.

The general attitude toward suicide has been termed "tolerant", and in many occasions suicide is seen as a morally responsible action. This cultural tolerance may stem from the historical function of suicide in the military. In feudal Japan, honorable formal suicide (seppuku) among samurai (Japanese warrior) was considered a justified response to failure or inevitable defeat in battle. Traditionally, seppuku involved the slashing open of one's stomach with a sword. The purpose of this was to release the samurai's spirit upon the enemy and thus avoid dishonorable execution and probable torture at the hand of an enemy. Today, honor suicides are also referred to as hara-kiri, literally "belly-cutting".

Cultural tolerance of suicide in Japan may also be explained by the concept of amae, or the need to be dependent on and accepted by others. For the Japanese, acceptance and conformity are valued above one's individuality. As a result of this perspective, one's worth is associated with how one is perceived by others. Ultimately, this can lead to fragile self-concept and an increased likelihood of considering dying by suicide when one feels alienated.

The cultural heritage of suicide as a noble tradition still has some resonance. While being investigated for an expenses scandal, Cabinet minister Toshikatsu Matsuoka took his life in 2007. The former governor of Tokyo, Shintaro Ishihara, described him as a "true samurai" for preserving his honour. Ishihara was also the scriptwriter for the film I Go To Die For You, which glorifies the memory and bravery of the kamikaze pilots in WWII.

Although Japanese culture historically permitted more tolerant views on the morality and social acceptability of suicide, the rapid growth in suicide rate since the 1990s has increased public concern about suicide. In particular, the trend of increased Internet usage among adolescents and young adults as well as the rising popularity of websites related to suicide has raised concerns from the public and the media about how Internet culture may be contributing to higher suicide rates.

One phenomenon that has been particularly concerning is that of shinjū (suicide pacts) that are formed among individuals, typically strangers, via Internet forums and messageboards. These pacts, which are popularly referred to as "Internet group suicide", are formed with the intention of all individuals meeting to die by suicide at the same time, by the same method.

While the concept of group suicide also has a historical presence in Japanese culture, traditional shinjū differs from modern Internet group suicide because it occurred among lovers or family members rather than among strangers. Another difference is that mutual consent from those who die by historical shinjū was not required. In other words, certain forms of shinjū might be considered "murder-suicide" in Western cultures rather than suicide. An example of this type of shinjū would be a mother killing her children and then killing herself.

An example of historical shinjū in Japanese literature can be found in Chikamatsu Monzaemon's puppet play from 1703 entitled Sonezaki Shinjuu ("The Love Suicides at Sonezaki"), which was later re-engineered for the kabuki theater. The inspiration for the play was an actual double suicide which had then recently occurred between two forbidden lovers.

These modern shinjū have not received the same level of tolerance or social acceptability as an honor suicide (seppuku or hara-kiri) from the Japanese media. Internet group suicide has generally been portrayed as a thoughtless and impulsive act by the media because it seems that there is no compelling reason for why individuals enter into such pacts. In contrast, seppuku serves a specific function; to preserve honor rather than die at the hand of an enemy. However, this perception has been challenged by research on Internet group suicide by Ozawa de-Silva, who argues that these deaths are "characterized by severe existential suffering, a loss of the "worth of living" (ikigai)...and a profound loneliness and lack of connection with others".

According to The New Yorker, "by tradition, a mother who killed herself but not her children was thought to be truly wicked."

A Yale Professor Suggested Mass Suicide for Old People in Japan

Government response
In 2007, the government released a nine-step plan, a "counter-suicide White Paper", with hopes of curbing suicide by 21% by 2017. The goal of the white paper is to encourage investigation of the root causes of suicide in order to prevent it, change cultural attitudes toward suicide, and improve treatment of suicides attempts. In 2009, the Japanese government committed 16.3 billion yen towards suicide prevention strategies.

Japan has allotted 12.4 billion yen ($133 million) in suicide prevention assets for the 2010 fiscal year ending March 2011, with plans to fund public counseling for those with overwhelming debts and those needing treatment for depression.

Amid the overall increase in self-inflicted death for 2009, the government claims there have been encouraging signs since September. The Cabinet Office said the number of monthly suicides declined year-on-year between September 2009 and April 2010. According to preliminary figures compiled by the NPA, the number of suicides fell 9.0 percent from the year before. In 2012, the number of annual suicides in Japan dropped below 30,000. In 2013, the number of suicides continued to decline.

In 2017, the Japanese government approved a plan to reduce suicides in Japan by 30% by setting up a guideline. It seeks to decrease the number of suicides to no more than 16,000 by 2025. The government has pledged to screen the mental health of post-natal mothers. In addition, a toll-free hotline was set up in response to prejudice against sexual minorities.

In 2021, the Japanese government appointed Tetsushi Sakamoto as the first Minister to Loneliness to reduce loneliness and social isolation among its citizens. This came after an increase during the July–October period of the country's suicide rate during the COVID-19 pandemic.

According to Japan Today, the number of people who committed suicide in Japan in 2021 was 20,830. The figure was 251 fewer than in 2020, however, it was 661 higher than 2019, the year before the coronavirus spread. Of the total, 13,815 were males, an increase of 240 over 2021, while 7,015 were females, 92 more than in 2020. Health ministry officials attributed the rise in suicides to effects of the prolonged coronavirus which has caused many people to lose their jobs or suffer a drop in income.

A 2022 study conducted by a team of researchers said there were 8,000 more suicides in Japan during the COVID-19 pandemic period—between March 2020 and June 2022—than would have been expected without it. The increase was mostly driven by a fallout on economic and social activities, leading the government to consider data such as the suicide rate to further relax antivirus measures.

See also

 Japanese work environment
 Shame society
 Suicide Circle
 Demographics of Japan
 Etiquette in Japan
 Health care system in Japan
 Health in Japan
 List of countries by suicide rate
 Jouhatsu

References

 
Society of Japan
Japanese culture
Health in Japan